Sergei Aleksandrovich Lutovinov (born 25 March 1975) is a Russian former professional footballer.

He made his professional debut in the Russian Second Division in 1992 for FC Oka Kolomna.

Honours
 Russian Premier League champion: 1997.
 Russian Cup winner: 1998.

European club competitions
With FC Spartak Moscow.

 UEFA Champions League 1997–98 qualification: 1 game.
 UEFA Cup 1997–98: 3 games.

References

1975 births
People from Kolomna
Living people
Russian footballers
Russia under-21 international footballers
FC Spartak Moscow players
FC Amkar Perm players
Maccabi Tel Aviv F.C. players
Russian expatriate footballers
Expatriate footballers in Israel
FC Oryol players
Russian Premier League players
Association football forwards
Sportspeople from Moscow Oblast